César Bonoris (September 22, 1927 – December 13, 2005) was an Argentine gymnast who competed in the 1948 Summer Olympics and the 1952 Summer Olympics.

References

1927 births
2005 deaths
Gymnasts at the 1948 Summer Olympics
Gymnasts at the 1952 Summer Olympics
Olympic gymnasts of Argentina
Pan American Games medalists in gymnastics
Pan American Games bronze medalists for Argentina
Gymnasts at the 1951 Pan American Games
Argentine male artistic gymnasts
Medalists at the 1951 Pan American Games
20th-century Argentine people